Chris Bodnar (born April 10, 1988 in Saskatoon, Saskatchewan) is a professional Canadian football placekicker and punter who is currently a free agent. He originally signed with the Edmonton Eskimos as an undrafted free agent in January 2011, but was released prior to training camp on June 4, 2011. He was later signed by the Roughriders on December 21, 2011. He played two years of CIS football for the Saskatchewan Huskies football team before joining the Saskatoon Hilltops of the Canadian Junior Football League. He then transferred to the University of Regina where he played two seasons for the Regina Rams.

On April 19, 2013, it was announced Bodnar was released by the Riders a second time.

References 

1988 births
Living people
Canadian football placekickers
Canadian football punters
Edmonton Elks players
Players of Canadian football from Saskatchewan
Regina Rams players
Saskatchewan Huskies football players
Saskatchewan Roughriders players
Sportspeople from Saskatoon